Cigerxwîn or Cegerxwîn (1903 – October 22, 1984) was a Kurdish writer and poet. He is known to be one of the most influential Kurdish writers and poets in the Kurdistan region of the Middle East, and his work has been renewed for the creation of hundreds of songs and played a crucial role in the preservation of Kurdish cultural heritage.

Biography

Cigerxwîn's real name was Sheikhmous Hasan. His pen name, Cigerxwîn, means "bleeding liver" in the Kurdish language. He was born to a Yazidi mother in the Kurdish village of Hesar close to the city of Batman, Ottoman Empire. The year of his birth is known, but no documentation exists to indicate the day and month. In 1914, at the beginning of World War I, his family became refugees and fled to Amude near the city of Qamishli in present-day north-eastern Syria.

Cigerxwîn studied theology and became a cleric in 1921. He and his compatriots established a Kurdish association in Amude. In 1946 he moved to Qamishli and became involved in politics. In the same year, he became the secretary of "Civata Azadî û Yekîtiya Kurd" (Kurdish Freedom and Union Front). In 1948 he joined the Communist Party of Syria and became the Party's candidate for the Syrian Parliament in 1954. He left the Communist Party in 1957 to create the "Azadî" (Freedom) organization. After a period of time, this new party was united with the Kurdish Democratic Party of Syria.

Cigerxwîn was arrested and jailed in Damascus in 1963 and was eventually exiled to the city of Suwayda. In 1969 he moved to Iraqi Kurdistan, where he became involved in the Kurdish uprising led by Mustafa Barzani. In 1973 he went to Lebanon where he published his widely publicized poetry collection Kîme Ez? (Who Am I?). In 1976, he returned to Syria, but three years later, at the age of 75 or 76, he again fled to Sweden. He was able to publish several collections of poetry in Sweden.

Cigerxwîn died in Stockholm at the age of 80 or 81. His body was returned to Kurdistan and buried at his house in Qamishli.

Works

Cigerxwîn began writing poetry in 1924. After the collapse of Sheikh Said's rebellion, he became a member of "Xoybûn" (Independence) party, which was established by the exiled Kurdish intellectuals in Syria.

Following the Sheikh Said rebellion he started contributing to the Kurdish journal Hawar by publishing poems. His poetry expresses the ideas of modern romanticism and realism while maintaining the classical form of traditional Kurdish poetry. In his poems, he sharply criticizes the backward feudal and religious establishments which were considered as the main reason for the Kurdish workers' and peasants' miserable living conditions. He also maintained that these backward forces are the main obstacle to ultimate Kurdish freedom and independence. In 1961, he created a new Kurdish language department, focused on Northern Kurdish (Kurmanji), at the University of Baghdad. During the same period, he was working in the Kurdish section of Radio Baghdad.
 
Cigerxwîn (Jigarkhwin) wrote in the Kurmanji dialect and his poetry has had such an enormous influence on the Kurdish people and culture throughout the Kurdistan region in the Middle East, that the time period during his writing is often called the Jigerkhwin-period in Kurdish poetry. He took good care of the old heritage from classical Kurdish poets like Jaziri and Ahmad Khani. His poetry is simple and revolutionary with a strong popular appeal often at the expense of the aesthetic.
He published eight collections of his poems, a book on Kurdistan's history, a Kurdish language dictionary and a book on Kurdish folklore.

Published works

Poem collections
First Collection of Poems, Dîwana yekem: Prîsk û Pêtî, 1945 Damascus.
Second Collection of Poems, Dîwana diwem: Sewra Azadî, 1954 Damascus.
Third Collection of Poems, Dîwana sêyem: Kîme Ez?, 1973 Beirut.
Fourth Collection of Poems, Dîwana çarem: Ronak,  Roja Nû Publishers, 1980 Stockholm.
Fifth Collection of Poems, Dîwana pêncem: Zend-Avista, Roja Nû Publishers, 1981 Stockholm.
Sixth Collection of Poems, Dîwana şeşem: Şefeq, Roja Nû Publishers, 1982 Stockholm.
Seventh Collection of Poems, Dîwana heftem: Hêvî, Roja Nû Publishers, 1983 Stockholm.
Eighth Collection of Poems, Dîwana heştem: Aştî, Kurdistan Publishers, 1985 Stockholm.

Language and Culture
Destûra Zimanê Kurdî (The Grammar of Kurdish Language), 1961 Baghdad.
Ferheng, perçê yekem (Kurdish Dictionary, First Part), 1962 Baghdad.
Ferheng, perçê diwem (Kurdish Dictionary, Second Part), 1962 Baghdad.

History
Tarîxa Kurdistan (History of Kurdistan), 3 Volumes, 1985, 1987 Stockholm.

See also 
A list of famous Kurdish poets, writers and philosophers, see CEGERXWÎN
Classic and Modern Kurdish Poetry, by Farhad Shakely
List of Books written by Cegerxwîn
Ismail Besikci, International Colony Kurdistan, (London: Parvana) 2004, 160 pp., map, .
Yazidis

References

Kurdish poets
Kurdish people
Kurdish-language writers
Literary critics
Lexicographers
Historians of the Middle East
1903 births
1984 deaths
Swedish people of Kurdish descent
Kurdish people from the Ottoman Empire
20th-century poets
20th-century lexicographers
Syrian emigrants to Sweden